Football was first introduced as an Olympic sports at the Summer Olympic Games held in France in 1900. It was played by only three club teams from three nations as an exhibition sport and played again at the 1904 Games. National sides played for the first time at the 1908 Summer Olympics. India did not send a football side to the Olympics until the 1948 Games; it participated in the next three  Games. An Indian team last participated in the 1960 Games. India's best appearance was at the 1956 Summer Olympics where its team reached the semi-finals. Beginning with the 1992 Summer Olympics, the rules were changed so that only under-23 national teams are allowed to compete in the Games. India's U-23 national team has yet to qualify for the Olympic football competition.

History

1948 Olympics: first participation

Warm-up 

In 1948, London hosted the 1948 Summer Olympic Games. The Indian football team made its first Olympic appearance in a match against France. This was the first match played by a team from the newly independent India. Coach Balaidas Chatterjee had prepared the team which successfully defeated Department Store XI 15–0 on 13 July, and the Metropolitan Police F.C. 3–1 on 16 July. The team then went on to defeat the Pinner F.C. by 9–1 on 24 July, Hayes F.C. by 4–1 on 26 July, and Alexandra Park FC by 8–2 on 28 July.

Most of the Indian players were not accustomed to wearing boots and some having dislike of being shod. However, during trials in India, the players wore boots as the pitch was wet due to heavy rain. Thus during the Games, the Indian team decided to wear shoes if the conditions were wet and if they had to play on soft grounds. As conditions were dry, most players opted to play without shoes and instead wore bandages to protect their feet. Of the eleven players who took the field against France eight players were barefooted, three wore boots.

The match 

Taj Mohammed, K. P. Dhanraj, Thenmadom Varghese wore boots. For the first 29 minutes neither team dominated proceedings, then in the 30th minute René Courbin gave France a 1–0 lead. Just before half-time, Swedish referee Gunnar Dahlner awarded India a penalty kick; Sailen Manna missed it as the ball flew over the crossbar. In the second half Ahmed Khan created an opening, he combined with substitute Balasundra Vajravelu, beat the French defense, and passed the ball to Sarangapani Raman who scored the equaliser in the 70th minute. His name was recorded as independent India's first international goal scorer. Ten minutes after Raman's equaliser, India had a chance to take the lead through another penalty. This time Mahabir Prasad's shot at the goal was saved by the French goalkeeper Guy Rouxel. With one minute to go before the final whistle René Persillon scored to give France a 2–1 victory and a place in the quarterfinals.

Media and appreciation 

The Indian team was acknowledged and appreciated by the crowd for their good sportsmanship. "The French had been given a run for their money – and that, too, by the barefooted Indians!", the British media reported. At a press conference, shortly after the match, the Indians were asked why they played barefooted. The Indian captain Talimeren Ao said, "Well, you see, we play football in India, whereas you play BOOTBALL!". This was applauded by the British and the next day Ao's comment was in the headlines of London's newspapers.

While the 1–2 loss to France and first round elimination was a huge disappointment to the team and the public alike, the quality of football the team displayed had captivated one and all. The Indian footballers' bravery and brilliance in bare feet at the 1948 Olympics earned them the admiration of Princess Margaret, the younger sister of Queen Elizabeth II. King George VI invited the team to Buckingham Palace and there, as the story goes, he lifted up Sailen Manna's trouser leg, telling him it was just to check if he really had legs of steel as it appeared from the strength of his shots. Encouraged by the accolades and the positive reception to India's football, the All India Football Federation (AIFF) decided to extend the tour with some friendlies across Europe over the next several weeks that enhanced the team's reputation at the time.

1952, 1956, and 1960 Olympics 
In 1952, under Sailen Manna's leadership at Helsinki, India would again lose in the first round, this time 10–1 to Yugoslavia. The Yugloslavian Branko Zebec scored four of the ten goals for his side; the lone goal for the Indian side was scored by Ahmed Khan in the 89th minute as the final goal of the match.

Four years later, at the 1956 Olympics in Melbourne, India attained its best outing at the Games as they reached the semi-finals of the tournament. The team was led by Samar Banerjee and India's most successful coach Syed Abdul Rahim, who coached the team at both the 1952 and 1960 Olympics. India reached the first round without playing a scheduled preliminary match. The team received a walkover because Hungary did not play. The team beat hosts Australia 4–2 and reached the semi-finals becoming the first Asian team to do so in Olympic history. At the match against Australia Neville D'Souza scored a hat trick. He scored two goals in the first half at the ninth and 33rd minutes. The first was a nod to the rebound from captain Samar Banerjee's shot to the opponent's post. Then in the 33rd minute D'Souza converted a cross from P. K. Banerjee who sent the ball into the net from the right flank. A third goal was scored in the second half at the 50th minute when Banerjee converted a free ball received from a melee between Indian striker Muhammad Kannayan and Australian goalkeeper Ron Lord. The fourth Indian goal was scored by J. Krishnaswamy at the 80th minute. Bruce Morrow scored two goals for the hosts.

However, India failed to reach the final losing to Yugoslavia by 4–1 in the semi finals. There were no goals scored in the first half. D'Souza scored the opening goal in the match for India at the 52nd minute, but in the next 15 minutes Yugoslavia scored three goals at the 54th, 57th and 65th minutes. A mistake by Indian defender Muhammad Salaam led to an own goal at the 78th minute ensuring Yugoslavia's victory in the match. After the loss, India faced Bulgaria in the bronze medal match where they were again defeated by a score of 3–0. With four goals Neville D'Souza became joint top scorer in that edition of the Games with Todor Veselinović of Yugoslavia and Dimitar Stoyanov of Bulgaria. 
 
At 1960 Olympics in Rome, India was placed in a group with strong sides from Hungary, France and Peru. The team was led by P. K. Banerjee under the coaching of Syed Abdul Rahim. Tulsidas Balaram scored two goals, one each in the matches against Hungary and Peru, both of which India lost. In the second match  Banerjee's goal in the 71st minute would help India hold France to a draw. With two losses and a draw, India placed at the bottom of the group and failed to move to the next round. This was the last time India qualified for the Olympics in football.

1964–present 
From 1908 to 1988, football at the Olympics was played by senior national teams. Between these years the India national football team competed at Games from 1948 to 1960. From 1992, FIFA allowed only U-23 national teams to play in the tournament at the Olympics. India withdrew from qualifying competition in the 1968, 1976 and 1988 Olympics. For the 1964, 1972, 1980 and 1984 Olympics India failed to qualify.

Though U-23 players were allowed, every qualifying matches from 1992 Olympics to the 2012 Olympics were played by India's senior national team. It failed to qualify for the Olympic finals from 1992 to 2012. The Asian Football Confederation (AFC) started the AFC U-23 Championship in 2013 which now acts as the qualifying tournament for the Olympics for Asian countries. The top three teams are allowed entry to the Olympic finals. India has yet to qualify for the AFC U-23 Championship and thus for the Olympics since then.

Record 
India has played eight football matches at the Olympic Games, and managed one win, one draw, and lost in six of them. India scored ten goals in seven matches against five different teams and conceded twenty-seven goals in eight matches against six different teams. In 1948 and 1952, India was automatically qualified to play in the final tournament and for the 1956 Olympics, India was scheduled to play against Thailand in the qualification round, but both the teams got a bye as the Republic of China and the Philippines teams withdrew from the qualification round.

For the 1960 Olympics, India was scheduled to play the first round of the qualification against Afghanistan. In the two-legged tie India won the away leg by 2−5 and in the home leg Afghanistan withdrew before the match. Eventually India moved to the second round where they defeated Indonesia in both legs and qualified for the Olympics. 1960 Olympics would be India's last participation till date. From 1964 to 2012 India failed to qualify for the Olympics. From 2016 onwards the AFC U-23 Championship was considered to be the qualification tournament for the Asian teams, which India failed to progress from.

Match summary 

India has scored the most goals against Australia in a 4–2 victory at the 1956 Olympics, their biggest win in the Olympic history. The most goals the team conceded were in a 1–10 loss against Yugoslavia at the 1952 Olympics, their largest defeat to date.	
		
† At 1956 Olympics, India got a walkover as Hungary withdrew from the match due to Hungarian Revolution, thus India proceeded to QF without playing any match in the first round.

Record by Opponent

Goalscorers

Coach, captain, and goalkeeper 

 ‡ S. S. Narayan was the goalkeeper for the team against Yugoslavia and Bulgaria and Peter Thangaraj kept the net for the quarter-final match against Australia at 1956 Olympics.

Squads

See also 

 History of the India national football team
 Football at the Summer Olympics
 India national football team at the FIFA World Cup qualification
 India at the AFC Asian Cup
 AFC U-23 Championship
 India national under-23 football team

References

External links 

 
 
 
 
 
 
 
 
 
 

 
History of sport in India
India national football team